Prof. Muchkund Dubey is a Former Ambassador and Former Indian Foreign Secretary, the administrative head of the Indian Foreign Service, Government of India.

Career 
He is also President of  Council for Social Development (CSI), and Chairman of the Asian Development Research Institute, Patna. He is also a Professor in International Relations at the Jawaharlal Nehru University, Delhi and Professor Emeritus at the Foreign Service Institute.

He is researching a wide array of issues related to world economy, international monetary and trading systems, security and disarmament, South Asian cooperation and international relations. Currently teaches as faculty in course Post Graduate Diploma Programme in Development Studies and would be the first module for a Masters in Development Studies, under newly formed Ambedkar University, Delhi (AUD), which is mandated to focus on teaching and research in social sciences and the humanities both at the under graduate as well as post graduate level.

Works

References

Year of birth missing (living people)
Living people
High Commissioners of India to Bangladesh
Indian civil servants
Indian Foreign Secretaries
Writers from Bihar
Academic staff of Jawaharlal Nehru University
Bihari politicians
20th-century Indian politicians
Indian political writers
Indian foreign policy writers
People from Deoghar district